Bairamov or Bayramov is a surname. Notable people with the surname include:

Vladimir Bairamov (born 1980), Turkmenistani footballer
Nazar Bayramov (born 1982), Turkmenistani footballer
Nuru Bayramov (born 1963), surgeon and professor
Rovshan Bayramov, Azerbaijani wrestler
Nurberdy Bairamov

Surnames of Georgian origin
Surnames of Azerbaijani origin
Azerbaijani-language surnames
Surnames of Uzbekistani origin